Spiromastix is a genus of fungi within the Onygenaceae family.

References

External links
Spiromastix at Index Fungorum

Onygenales